VV De Meern is a football club from De Meern, Netherlands. VV De Meern plays in the Sunday Hoofdklasse.

History
In the 2018 De Meern relegated to the Hoofdklasse after just one season in the Derde Divisie. During the preparation for the 2018–019 season, it could barely beat Eerste Klasse-side Roda '46 2–1.

References

External links
 Official site

Football clubs in the Netherlands
Football clubs in Utrecht (city)
Association football clubs established in 1947
1947 establishments in the Netherlands